David Freedman (1898–1936) was a Romanian-born American playwright and biographer.

David Freedman may also refer to:
David Freedman (cricketer) (born 1964), Australian first-class cricketer
David Noel Freedman (1922–2008), biblical scholar and author
David A. Freedman (1938–2008), American professor of statistics
David Freedman (screenwriter) (born 1965), writer and co creator of The Mr Hell Show

See also
 David Friedman (disambiguation)
 David Freeman (disambiguation)